The  is a Kofun period keyhole-shaped burial mound, located in the Yamaga neighborhood of the town of Taishi, Minamikawachi District, Osaka in the Kansai region of Japan. The tumulus was designated a National Historic Site of Japan in 1956, with the area under protection extended in 2019.

Overview
The Futagozuka Kofun is an unusual , which is shaped like two conjoined squares, when viewed from above. It is located on a hill at the foot of Mount Nijō in the Kongō Range in southeastern part of Osaka Prefecture. Each tumulus is 25 meters on a side, and are connected in parallel along a northeast–southwest axis for a total length of about 66 meters. No fukiishi or haniwa have been found on the tumuli, although there is evidence of a moat. The horizontal-type stone burial chambers are almost the same shape and size on the east and west tumuli and both open to the southwest. The surface of one of the burial chambers retains traces of plastered walls. Inside each burial chamber was a house-shaped stone sarcophagus of almost the same shape and size with a semi-cylindrical lid stone with protrusion for hanging by ropes. Each has a length of about 2.2 meters, a width of about 1 meter, and a height of about 0.7 meters. The tumulus has been robbed in antiquity, and only some fragments of pottery and iron nails have survived of the grave goods. The tumulus estimated to date from the first half of the 7th century, or the end of the Kofun period, into the Asuka period.

There is a tradition that the Futagozuka Kofun is the true tomb of the 33rd Empress Suiko (died 628 AD) and her son Prince Takeda (died 593? AD), although the Imperial Household Agency has proclaimed the  200 meters to the west to be her official grave site.

The Futagozuka Kofun is located about 14 minutes by car from Kaminotaishi Station on the Kintetsu Minami-Osaka Line.

Total length 66 meters:
Eastern rectangular portion 25 X 25 meters, 4.8 meters high, 3-tier
Western rectangular portion 25 X 25 meters, 6 meters high, 3-tier

Gallery

See also
List of Historic Sites of Japan (Osaka)

References

External links

Taishi Town home page 
Taishi Tourist Information 

History of Osaka Prefecture
Taishi, Osaka
Historic Sites of Japan
Archaeological sites in Japan
Kofun